Veniamin Igorevich Tayanovich (born 6 April 1967 in Ufa) is a retired Russian freestyle swimmer.

Tayanovich is best known for winning the gold medal in the Men's 4 × 200 m Freestyle event at the 1992 Summer Olympics at Barcelona, alongside Vladimir Pyshnenko, Dmitry Lepikov, Aleksey Kudryavtsev (heats), Yury Mukhin (heats) and Yevgeny Sadovyi. At the same Olympic Games he also claimed the silver medal with the 4 × 100 m freestyle team, swimming in the qualifying heats.

References
 

1967 births
Living people
Russian male freestyle swimmers
Soviet male freestyle swimmers
Olympic swimmers of the Unified Team
Swimmers at the 1992 Summer Olympics
Olympic gold medalists for the Unified Team
Olympic silver medalists for the Unified Team
World record setters in swimming
World Aquatics Championships medalists in swimming
European Aquatics Championships medalists in swimming
Sportspeople from Ufa
Medalists at the 1992 Summer Olympics
Olympic gold medalists in swimming
Olympic silver medalists in swimming